New South, New South Democracy or New South Creed is a slogan in the history of the American South first used after the American Civil War. Reformers used it to call for a modernization of society and attitudes, to integrate more fully with the United States as a whole, reject the economy and traditions of the Old South, and the slavery-based plantation system of the antebellum period. The term was coined by its leading spokesman, Atlanta editor Henry W. Grady in 1874.

Etymology and philosophy
The original use of the term "New South" was an attempt to prescribe an attractive future based on a growing economy. The industrial revolution of the Northern U.S. was the model. The antebellum South was heavily agrarian. Following the American Civil War, the South was impoverished and heavily rural; it was mainly reliant on cotton and a few other crops with low market prices. Economically, it was in great need of industrialization. With slavery abolished, African Americans were playing a different role in the New South. Henry W. Grady made this term popular in his articles and speeches as editor of the Atlanta Constitution. Richard Hathaway Edmonds of the Baltimore Manufacturers' Record was another staunch advocate of New South industrialization. The Manufacturers' Record was one of the most widely read and powerful publications among turn of the 20th-century industrialists. Historian Paul Gaston coined the specific term "New South Creed" to describe the promises of visionaries like Grady, who said industrialization would bring prosperity to the region.

The classic history was written by C. Vann Woodward: The Origins of the New South: 1877–1913, published in 1951 by Louisiana State University Press. Sheldon Hackney, a Woodward student, hails the book but explains:

The New South campaign was championed by Southern elites often outside of the old planter class. Their hopes were to make a fresh "new" start, forming partnerships with Northern capitalists in order to modernize and speed up economic development of the South. From Henry Grady to black leader Booker T. Washington, New South advocates wanted southern economic regeneration, sectional reconciliation, racial harmony, and believed in the gospel of work.

The rise of the New South, however, involved the continued supremacy of whites over blacks, who had little or no political power once Reconstruction was over, Federal troops were withdrawn from the South as a result of the Compromise of 1877, and Jim Crow laws were put in place to suppress black rights . For example, Grady stated in an 1888 speech about the New South, "The supremacy of the white race of the South must be maintained forever, and the domination of the negro race resisted at all points and at all hazards because the white race is the superior race ... [This declaration] shall run forever with the blood that feeds Anglo-Saxon hearts."

History

Great Depression and World War II
The economic woes of the Great Depression dampened much New South enthusiasm, as investment capital dried up and the rest of the nation began to view the South as an economic failure. World War II would usher in a degree of economic prosperity, as efforts to industrialize in support of the War effort were employed. In the southern mountains, the Tennessee Valley Authority built dams, and generated employment and electricity that affected numerous residents and manufacturers alike. Other southern industries, such as mining, steel, and ship building, flourished during World War II and set the stage for increased industrialization, urban development, and economic prosperity in southern ports and cities in the second half of the 20th century.

In the post-World War II era, American textiles makers and other light industries moved en masse to the South, to capitalize on low wages, social conservatism, and anti-union sentiments.  With the industrialization of the South came economic change, migration, immigration and population growth. Light industries would move offshore, but has been replaced to a degree by auto manufacturing, tourism, and energy production, among others. In light of the many social and economic changes that have occurred since the Civil War, many now use the term in a celebratory sense.

Civil Rights era 
The beginnings of the Civil Rights era in the 1950s and 1960s, led to a revival of the term to describe a South which would no longer be held back by Jim Crow Laws and other aspects of compulsory legal segregation. Racist conflicts during the Civil Rights Movement gave the American South a backward image in popular culture. Again, the initial slow pace of civil rights reforms, notably in the areas of school desegregation and voting rights, at first made the "New South" more of a slogan than a description of the South as it actually was. The Civil Rights Act of 1964 and the Voting Rights Act of 1965 would bring an era of far more rapid change. During the 1960s, the black population finally began being enfranchised and represented in political offices.

Political uses 
For over 100 years, from before the Civil War until the mid-1960s, the Democratic Party exercised a virtual monopoly on Southern politics, that came to be known as the Solid South. Thus elections were actually decided between Democratic factions in primary elections, often all-white. The Democratic nomination was considered to be tantamount to election.

The "New South" period is double-edged. After the passage of civil rights legislation, African Americans began to vote in number for the Democratic Party. Many had supported Franklin D. Roosevelt's New Deal programs, along with Harry S. Truman, John F. Kennedy, and Lyndon B. Johnson who had supported their causes. At the same time, in 1964, several white Southern politicians and state voters supported Republican Barry Goldwater for President over Democratic incumbent Lyndon B. Johnson. In what later became a trend, some switched party affiliations, notably Strom Thurmond of South Carolina. Richard Nixon's Southern strategy in the 1968 campaign is thought by many to have vastly accelerated this process. From Nixon's time to the present, the South has often voted Republican at the presidential level.

The term "New South" has also been used to refer to political leaders in the American South who embraced progressive ideas on education and economic growth and minimized racist rhetoric, even if not promoting integration. This term was most commonly associated with the wave of Southern governors elected in the late 1960s and 1970s, including Terry Sanford in North Carolina, Carl Sanders and Jimmy Carter in Georgia, and Albert Brewer in Alabama.

Similarly, the term "New South" has also been used to refer to areas of the South that have become more diverse and cosmopolitan over the last several decades.

Modern economy 
The "New South" also meant to describe economic growth in the American South. Since the late 20th century, this can be seen in many ways. The largest company in the world by revenue is Walmart, which is located in Bentonville, Arkansas. Two of the largest U.S. banks, Bank of America and Wells Fargo, have a major presence in Charlotte, North Carolina. Bank of America is headquartered there, and Wells Fargo has maintained much of the operation of Wachovia after acquiring it in 2008. Charlotte is also home to many other major corporations including Lowe's, Duke Energy, Family Dollar, Lendingtree and Honeywell.

Automotive manufacturing plants in U.S. have declined in cities like Detroit, Cleveland, Buffalo, and St. Louis, while lower wage, non-unionized work forces in the American South have attracted foreign manufacturers. Automobile manufacturers BMW, Toyota, Mercedes, Honda, Hyundai, Kia, Nissan, and Volkswagen have opened plants in states such as Georgia, Alabama, South Carolina, Kentucky, Tennessee, Texas, Mississippi, and West Virginia. Meanwhile, General Motors factories continue to operate in Kentucky, Louisiana, Tennessee and Texas, and two Ford factories operate in Kentucky's largest city of Louisville.

High-profile companies such as IBM, Intel, Verizon and Microsoft have major corporate presence in the Research Triangle of North Carolina. Additionally, several Fortune 500 companies, including Tesla, Inc. and a number of technology companies, are now headquartered in Austin, Texas, giving it the nickname of "Silicon Hills".

American Airlines Group, the largest airline in the world as of 2019, is headquartered in the Dallas–Fort Worth metroplex in Fort Worth. Dallas is also home to many global corporations, including the largest energy company in the world ExxonMobil, the largest Telecommunication company in the world AT&T, and the company where the microchip was first invented Texas Instruments. The Dallas-Fort Worth metro area is also the largest metro area in the South.

Delta Air Lines, one of the world's largest airlines, is headquartered in Atlanta, Georgia. Atlanta is also home to many global corporations, including The Coca-Cola Company, UPS, CNN, Norfolk Southern, NCR, Mercedes-Benz, and Porsche.

See also
 Border states
 Deep South
 History of the Southern United States
 Solid South
 Sun Belt
 Upland South

References
Notes

Bibliography
 Ayers, Edward L.  The Promise of the New South: Life After Reconstruction  (Oxford University Press, 1992)
 Brown, D. Clayton.  King Cotton: A Cultural, Political, and Economic History since 1945 (University Press of Mississippi, 2011) 440 pp. 
 Gaston, Paul M. The New South Creed: A Study in Southern Myth-Making (1976)
 Tindall, George. The Emergence of the New South, 1913–1945 (1970)
 .
 , the classic history. online
 .

Primary sources
 Clark, Thomas D. Travels in the New South, 1865–1955: A Bibliography (2 vols., 1962), An annotated bibliography of about 1000 books published by travelers in the South; discusses the background of the author, the content, the author's viewpoint or bias, and the quality of the information. Some titles are on line at books.google.com.
 , the classic statement.
  By a Harvard professor; focus on race relations

External links
 H-SHGAPE discussion forum for people studying the Gilded Age and Progressive Era

 H-SOUTH discussion forum for people studying the American South
 .

1870s neologisms
Regions of the United States
Politics of the Southern United States
History of racial segregation in the United States
History of racism in the United States
History of the Southern United States
Political history of the United States
Politics and race in the United States
Reconstruction Era
Social history of the United States
White supremacy in the United States